Peanuts Road Rally may refer to several amusement ride located at six different Cedar Fair Parks:

 Road Rally at Kings Dominion
 PEANUTS Off-Road Rally at Kings Island
 PEANUTS Road Rally at Cedar Point
 PEANUTS Road Rally at Dorney Park & Wildwater Kingdom
 PEANUTS Road Rally at Valleyfair
 PEANUTS Road Rally at Worlds of Fun

See also
Road rally (disambiguation)